Shawo is a township of Qi County, Kaifeng in eastern Henan province, China, located  southwest of the county seat and more than  southeast of downtown Kaifeng. , it has 26 villages under its administration.

See also 
 List of township-level divisions of Henan

References 

Township-level divisions of Henan